Thomas Reynold (fl. 1395–1397), of Leominster, Herefordshire, was an English politician.

He was a Member (MP) of the Parliament of England for Leominster in 1395 and January 1397.

References

14th-century births
Year of death missing
English MPs 1395
People from Leominster
English MPs January 1397